Ethelsville is a town in Pickens County, Alabama, United States.  

Originally it name named Yorkville. It took its current name from Ethel Burgin Hancock, the daughter of local physician J. T. Hancock. His son Thomas was the town's first postmaster. The town was incorporated in 1952 or 1956, depending on the source, and at the time was still an active railroad stop, with four freight trains and six passenger trains stopping there daily. When the railroad discontinued stops in Ethelsville, the population began to decline. In 1843, local resident John H. Alexander discovered a shield and pair of copper scales while plowing his fields. The shield was engraved with the word "Hispana," which most historians have recognized as evidence that Spanish explorer Hernando de Soto likely passed through Pickens County. Local legend claims that De Soto and his men spent a winter on the hill where Ethelsville Baptist Church stands. 

The town was moved one half mile from its original site when the M & O railroad was built in 1898.

Geography
Ethelsville is located at  (33.413563, -88.215516).

Demographics

2020 census

As of the 2020 United States census, there were 49 people, 52 households, and 42 families residing in the town.

2010 census
As of the 2010 census, there were 81 people, 37 households, and 23 families living in the town. The racial makeup of the town was 74.07% White and 25.93% Black or African American.

As of 2019, children under the age of 18 represented 36.6% of the population while 8.9% of residents were aged 65 or older. The median age of Ethelsville was 24.6 years old as compared to the 38.1 year-old median age of the United States. 4.1% of Ethelsvillians were veterans and 21.6% of its residents spoke a language other than English at home. 

Of its residents, 54.8% had graduated high school or received an equivalent degree, while 9.5% each had acquired an Associate degree and Bachelor's degree. Ethelsville residents commuted an average of 18 minutes to work, compared to the national average of 26.9 minutes. 79.6% of its residents drove alone to work, while 14.8% walked and 5.6% worked from home.

Household median income for Ethelsville's 59 housing units in 2019 was $39,167. The median income for a woman in the town was $35,156 in 2019, while the national average for women was $43,022. Males made far less, earning an average of just $23,750 annually. A full 51.3% of its residents lived below the poverty line. As of 2019, only 44.6% of its residents were employed.

References

Towns in Pickens County, Alabama
Towns in Alabama